The Free Quaker Meetinghouse is a historic Free Quaker meeting house at the southeast corner of 5th and Arch Streets in the Independence National Historical Park in Philadelphia, Pennsylvania.  It was built in 1783, and is a plain 2 -story brick building with a gable roof.  The second floor was added in 1788.  The building was moved about 30 feet to its present site in 1961, to allow for the widening of Fifth Street.

Quaker meetings were held in the building until 1836, after which it was occupied by the Apprentices' Library Company of Philadelphia until 1897.

The meetinghouse was added to the National Register of Historic Places in 1971.

References
Notes

External links
Visiting information

Churches in Philadelphia
Quaker meeting houses in Pennsylvania
Buildings and structures in Independence National Historical Park
Churches completed in 1783
Churches on the National Register of Historic Places in Pennsylvania
Buildings and structures on the National Register of Historic Places in Philadelphia
Relocated buildings and structures in Pennsylvania
Historic American Buildings Survey in Philadelphia
18th-century architecture in the United States
18th-century Quaker meeting houses
Federal architecture in Pennsylvania
1783 establishments in Pennsylvania